Transcend may refer to:
 Transcend (album) (2004), an album by Canadian singer-songwriter Carole Pope
 Transcend Information, a Taiwanese electronics manufacturer
 Transcend Music, a British record label
 Transcend: Nine Steps to Living Well Forever (2009), a book by Ray Kurzweil

See also
 Transcendence (disambiguation)
 Transcender